Key Largo is an unincorporated area and census-designated place in Monroe County, Florida, United States, located on the island of Key Largo in the upper Florida Keys. The population was 12,447 at the 2020 census, up from 10,433 in 2010. The name comes from the Spanish Cayo Largo, or "long key". It is both the first island and town of the Florida Keys to be reached from the Overseas Highway to Key West. It was also the location of one of the stations of the Overseas Railroad.

Geography
Key Largo is located at  (25.106637, -80.429917). It shares the island of Key Largo with Tavernier to the southwest and North Key Largo to the northeast. U.S. Route 1, the Overseas Highway, runs the length of the community, leading north  to Miami and southwest  to Key West.

Key Largo is the location of the first undersea park in the United States, established in 1963, and called the John Pennekamp Coral Reef State Park (located at Mile Marker 102). Adjacent to this is the Florida Keys National Marine Sanctuary covering 178 square nautical miles. Both areas were designed to protect marine life, including the extensive coral reefs in the area.

Climate
According to the Köppen climate classification, Key Largo has a tropical monsoon climate (Am).

Demographics

2020 census

As of the 2020 United States census, there were 12,447 people, 4,326 households, and 2,692 families residing in the CDP. The population density was 377.7/km2 (978.1/mi2). There were 8,043 housing units at an average density of 255.6/km2 (661.9/mi2). There were 4,326 households, out of which 23.7% had children under the age of 18 living with them, 50.5% were married couples living together, 7.4% had a female householder with no husband present, and 37.3% were non-families. 27.6% of all households were made up of individuals, and 8.8% had someone living alone who was 65 years of age or older. The average household size was 2.26, and the average family size was 2.75.

In the CDP, the population was spread out, with 19.7% under the age of 18, 5.6% from 18 to 24, 28.7% from 25 to 44, 30.3% from 45 to 64, and 15.8% who were 65 years of age or older. The median age was 43 years. For every 100 females, there were 107.8 males. For every 100 females age 18 and over, there were 107.6 males.

The average income for a household in the CDP was $42,577, and the median income for a family was $50,755. Males had a median income of $33,588 versus $25,468 for females. The per capita income for the CDP was $25,441. About 5.9% of families and 8.3% of the population were below the poverty line, including 8.7% of those under age 18 and 7.8% of those age 65 or over.

Education

The Monroe County School District operates the Key Largo School.

The Roman Catholic Archdiocese of Miami formerly operated the Saint Justin Martyr, Academy of Marine Science (PK-9) school in Key Largo.

In popular culture
The 1948 film Key Largo, starring Edward G. Robinson, Lauren Bacall, and Humphrey Bogart, was set there. The 1981 hit single "Key Largo" by Bertie Higgins was inspired by the film, not the namesake town. Conversely, the 1984 single "Smooth Operator" by Sade references the town, rather than the film.  The song "Kokomo" by the Beach Boys also references Key Largo.

Notable people
 Dick Rutkowski, founder of IANTD

References

External links
Key Largo Chamber of Commerce Business and Tourism Development
Monroe County School District Key Largo Public Schools
History of Key Largo

Census-designated places in Monroe County, Florida
Seaside resorts in Florida
Populated coastal places in Florida on the Atlantic Ocean
Census-designated places in Florida
Key Largo